The Marske XM-1 was an American mid-wing, single-seat, experimental tailless glider that was designed and built by Jim Marske in 1957.

Experimentation with the XM-1 lead to the final configuration of the later Marske Pioneer.

Design and development
The first of Marske's flying wings was the XM-1, a design inspired by the flying wing designs of Charles Fauvel and Al Backstrom. He built the XM-1 when he was 19 years old. The aircraft went through several versions, each a modification of the same basic airframe as Marske experimented with configurations. The aircraft started off with fins on the wing tips and was later converted to a single fin at the rear of the short fuselage in its "XM-1D" configuration.

The XM-1 was built with a welded steel tube fuselage covered in fiberglass. The  wing was fabricated from wood and covered with doped aircraft fabric. The wing employed a 14% Fauvel airfoil. The landing gear was a fixed monowheel.

Only one XM-1 was built. It was registered with the US Federal Aviation Administration in the Experimental - Amateur-built category.

Operational history
The XM-1 was described by Soaring Magazine as "easy to fly". The aircraft was stall and spin proof. Marske sold the aircraft and it went through a series of owners. The XM-1 was later removed from the FAA register and likely no longer exists.

Variants
 
XM-1-A
Initial configuration with wing tip fins and rudders.
XM-1-B
with minor improvements over the XM-1-A
XM-1-C
Modified with a central fin only.
XM-1D
Final configuration with a central fin and rudder.

Specifications (XM-1B)

See also

References

External links

1950s United States sailplanes
XM-1
Aircraft first flown in 1957
Tailless aircraft
Mid-wing aircraft